The blue whistling thrush (Myophonus caeruleus) is a whistling thrush that is found in the mountains of Central Asia, South Asia, China and Southeast Asia. It is known for its loud human-like whistling song at dawn and dusk. The widely distributed populations show variations in size and plumage with several of them considered as subspecies. Like others in the genus, they feed on the ground, often along streams and in damp places foraging for snails, crabs, fruits and insects.

Description

This whistling thrush is dark violet blue with shiny spangling on the tips of the body feathers other than on the lores, abdomen and under the tail. The wing coverts are a slightly different shade of blue and the median coverts have white spots at their tips. The bill is yellow and stands in contrast. The inner webs of the flight and tail feathers is black. The sexes are similar in plumage.

It measures  in length. For comparison, the blue whistling thrush commonly weighs twice as much as an American robin. This species is possibly the largest extant thrush though size overlap does occur with the similar by length great thrush and the insular Amami thrush, whose mean body mass falls around the middle of those of the whistling thrush. Size varies across the range with larger thrushes found to the north of the species range and slightly smaller ones to the south, corresponding with Bergmann's rule.

Several populations are given subspecies status. The nominate form with a black bill is found in central and eastern China. The population in Afghanistan, turkestanicus, is often included in the widespread temminckii which has a smaller bill width at the base and is found along the Himalayas east to northern Burma. The population eugenei, which lacks white spots on the median coverts, is found south into Thailand. Cambodia and the Malay peninsula have crassirostris, while dichrorhynchus with smaller spangles occurs further south and in Sumatra. The Javan population, flavirostris, has the thickest bill. The subspecies status of several populations has been questioned.

Habitat and distribution
It is found along the Tian Shan and Himalayas, in temperate forests and subtropical or tropical moist montane forests. The species ranges across Afghanistan, Bangladesh, Bhutan, Cambodia, China, Hong Kong, India, Indonesia, Kazakhstan, Laos, Macau, Malaysia, Myanmar, Nepal, Tajikistan, Thailand, Tibet, Turkmenistan, Pakistan and Vietnam. They make altitudinal movements in the Himalayas, descending in winter.

Behaviour and ecology
The blue whistling thrush is usually found singly or in pairs. They hop on rocks and move about in quick spurts. They turn over leaves and small stones, cocking their head and checking for movements of prey. When alarmed they spread and droop their tail. They are active well after dusk and during the breeding season (April to August) they tend to sing during the darkness of dawn and dusk when few other birds are calling. The call precedes sunrise the most during November. The alarm call is a shrill kree. The nest is a cup of moss and roots placed in a ledge or hollow beside a stream. The usual clutch consists of 3 to 4 eggs, the pair sometimes raising a second brood. They feed on fruits, earthworms, insects, crabs and snails. Snails and crabs are typically battered on a rock before feeding. In captivity, they have been known to kill and eat mice and in the wild have been recorded preying on small birds.

References

External links

 Photos, videos and sounds
 Calls and songs on Xeno-Canto
 Blue Whistling Thrush on Avibase
  Oriental Bird Images: Blue Whistling Thrush  Selected images

Myophonus
Birds of Afghanistan
Birds of Central Asia
Birds of Tibet
Birds of China
Birds of Northeast India
Birds of Southeast Asia
Birds of the Himalayas
blue whistling thrush
Taxa named by Giovanni Antonio Scopoli
Taxonomy articles created by Polbot